Curler may refer to:

 a sportsperson who plays curling
 a curling iron
 a hair roller

See also

Curlee (disambiguation)
Curlew (disambiguation)
Curley (disambiguation)